Gedrosia is a dry, mountainous country along the northwestern shores of the Indian Ocean. It was occupied in the Bronze Age by people who settled in the few oases in the region. Other people settled on the coast and became known in Greek as Ichthyophagi.

The country was conquered by the Persian king Cyrus the Great (559-530 BCE), although information about his campaign is comparatively late. The capital of Gedrosia was Pura, which is probably identical to modern Bampûr, forty kilometers west of Irânshahr.

Gedrosia became famous in Europe when the Macedonian king Alexander the Great tried to cross the Gedrosian desert and lost one third of his men.

Several scholars have argued that the Persian satrapy Maka is identical to Gedrosia (which is a Greek name). One argument is the similarity of the name Maka to the modern name Makran, a part of Pakistan and Iran that is situated a bit more to the east. However, it is more likely that Maka is to be sought in modern Oman, which was called Maketa in Antiquity.

See also
 Paratan (satrapy)

References

Achaemenid satrapies